Cyperus duripes is a species of sedge that is native to the Revillagigedo Islands off Mexico in the Pacific Ocean.

See also 
 List of Cyperus species

References 

duripes
Plants described in 1931
Flora of Mexico
Taxa named by Ivan Murray Johnston